Harold "Pee-Wee" Oliver (October 26, 1898 – June 16, 1985) was a Canadian ice hockey forward who played for the Calgary Tigers of the Western Canada Hockey League (WCHL) and the Boston Bruins and New York Americans of the National Hockey League (NHL) between 1921 and 1937. He was a member of the Tigers' 1924 WCHL championship and won the Stanley Cup with the Bruins in 1929. Oliver played nearly 600 games in a professional career that spanned 16 seasons and scored 217 goals. He was inducted into the Hockey Hall of Fame in 1967.

Playing career
Oliver grew up in Selkirk, Manitoba and played both junior and senior hockey with the Selkirk Fishermen.  Oliver and the Fishermen won the Manitoba Senior Hockey League in 1919 and challenged the Hamilton Tigers for the Allan Cup. Oliver scored a goal in the second game, but the Fishermen lost the two-game series on total goals, 7–6.  He left Selkirk for a professional career in Calgary in 1920.  He played one season with the Calgary Canadians of the independent Big-4 League in 1919–20 then moved to the Calgary Tigers and the new Western Canada Hockey League.  Oliver quickly established himself as a star player in the WCHL, using his speed and shot to earn positions as a First-Team All-Star in both 1924 and 1925. He was a key member of the Tigers' team that won the 1923–24 WCHL championship, and lost to the Montreal Canadiens for the Stanley Cup.

When the WCHL collapsed in 1926, Oliver's rights were bought by the Boston Bruins. His NHL career began on a line with Bill Carson and Percy Galbraith, and he led the Bruins in scoring each of his first three seasons with the team.  Oliver scored four goals in a game versus Chicago on January 11, 1927, becoming the first Boston Bruin to attain that feat. He won the Stanley Cup with Boston in 1929 and remained with the organization for eight years.  Oliver became the first Boston Bruin to score a playoff overtime goal when he notched the winner on March 20, 1930 versus the Montreal Maroons.  The Bruins sold his rights to the New York Americans in 1934, and Oliver completed his career with three seasons in New York. Well regarded for his gentlemanly nature on the ice, Oliver was inducted into the Hockey Hall of Fame in 1967, and is an honoured member of the Manitoba Hockey Hall of Fame.

Following his career, Oliver returned to Selkirk, working first as an electrician, then moved to Winnipeg where he worked for the Weights and Measures Department of the Canadian Government.  He died in 1985.

Career statistics

Regular season and playoffs

References

External links 
 

1898 births
1985 deaths
Boston Bruins players
Calgary Tigers players
Canadian ice hockey defencemen
Hockey Hall of Fame inductees
Ice hockey people from Manitoba
New York Americans players
Selkirk Jr. Fishermen players
Sportspeople from Selkirk, Manitoba
Stanley Cup champions
Western Canada Hockey League players